The Noble Quran: Meaning With Explanatory Notes is a two-volume translation of the Quran, authored by Pakistani Islamic scholar Taqi Usmani, who formerly served as judge of the Sharia Appellate Bench of the Supreme Court of Pakistan. The work was published in 2007.In addition to the original Arabic text, the translation also includes brief English explanatory notes. It is seen as the first-ever English translation of the Quran authored by a traditionalist Deobandi scholar.

Background 
In 1933, Abdul Majid Daryabadi became one of the first Deobandi scholars to attempt translating the Quran into English. However, the translation was not published until 1957. Daryabadi was not a traditional scholar who had studied at any seminary, however, Muhammad Shafi Deobandi, an alumnus of Darul Uloom Deoband, completed writing Ma'ariful Qur'an, a commentary on the Quran in Urdu, in 1972. 

The English translation process of Ma'ariful Qur'an began during the lifetime of its author. The work was taken care of by Taqi Usmani, Muhammad Hasan Askari, and Muhammad Shamim, with Muhammad Wali Razi as their assistant. The work was temporarily halted in 1977, but resumed in 1989, with the complete volumes being published in 2004. 

Subsequently, in 2007, Taqi Usmani published The Noble Quran: Meaning With Explanatory Notes from the Maktabah of Darul Uloom Karachi, in Pakistan. The commentary draws upon the Urdu version of Ma'ariful Qur'an. Taqi Usmani's work as such appears a reproduction of the former, with Usmani making several word substitutions while keeping the original text intact. Moreover, he added sufficient explanatory notes, as he expressed in his introduction to the English translation of Ma'ariful Qur'an that his intention was to provide a new translation of the Quran instead of solely translating Ma'ariful Qur'an into English.

Approach 
The book features an English transliteration and translation of the supplication, along with a detailed 20-page index. The translation draws on classical Islamic sources and the author's knowledge of Islamic jurisprudence and experience as a judge, with the aim of providing a better understanding of the Quranic message and its relevance to contemporary issues. Difficult terms have been explained with the help of brief explanatory notes.

A brief introduction to each Surah precedes its interpretation. It covers topics such as the meaning and significance of revelation, style and context of revelation, classification of Surahs as Meccan or Medinan, causes of revelation, Quran preservation methods, the seven Quranic readings, sources of interpretation, and the usage of letters like "waaw" and "qaf" in the text.

The deluxe edition of the book features illuminated medallions in the margins that designate the beginning of a new Surah or Juz. The text is typeset in a clear and elegant style based on the Madinan Mushaf, while retaining the useful features of the Indian Subcontinent copy.

See also 
 Muhammad Taqi Usmani bibliography

References

External links 
 The Noble Quran: Meaning With Explanatory Notes at Internet Archive

English translations of the Quran
Deobandi literature
Books by Muhammad Taqi Usmani
Islamic literature
Sunni literature
Hanafi literature
English-language books
Pakistani non-fiction books
2007 books
Sunni tafsir